
This is a list of postal codes in Canada where the first letter is N. Postal codes beginning with N are located within the Canadian province of Ontario. Only the first three characters are listed, corresponding to the Forward Sortation Area.

Canada Post provides a free postal code look-up tool on its website, via its mobile apps for such smartphones as the iPhone and BlackBerry,  and sells hard-copy directories and CD-ROMs. Many vendors also sell validation tools, which allow customers to properly match addresses and postal codes. Hard-copy directories can also be consulted in all post offices, and some libraries.

Western Ontario - 119 FSAs

Urban

Rural

References

N
Communications in Ontario
Postal codes N